Willy Carbo (born 14 August 1959 in Utrecht, Netherlands) is a retired Dutch footballer who played as a forward.

Club career
He made his professional debut and scored the first goal for hometown club FC Utrecht in the game against Go Ahead Eagles on 16 March 1980. He moved abroad to play in Belgium for Club Brugge, only to be loaned to Feyenoord in the second half of the season and winning the Dutch Eredivisie in a team containing Johan Cruyff and Ruud Gullit. With Brugge he played in the 1983 Belgian Cup Final, losing to Beveren.

He later played for FC Twente, RKC, NEC and Cambuur where he finished his career.

Backheel goal
Carbo is mostly remembered for his famous backheel goal when he played for FC Twente against Go Ahead Eagles in September 1984.

Honours
Feyenoord Rotterdam
 Eredivisie: 1983–84
 KNVB Cup: 1983–84

References

External links
 

1959 births
Living people
Footballers from Utrecht (city)
Dutch footballers
Netherlands under-21 international footballers
Association football forwards
FC Utrecht players
Club Brugge KV players
Feyenoord players
FC Twente players
RKC Waalwijk players
NEC Nijmegen players
SC Cambuur players
Dutch expatriate footballers
Expatriate footballers in Belgium
Dutch expatriate sportspeople in Belgium
Eredivisie players
Eerste Divisie players
Belgian Pro League players